Michel de La Guerre (c. 16051679) was a French organist and composer. His Triomphe de l'Amour sur les Bergers et les Bergères, with librettist Charles de Beys which was first sung in 1655, and staged in 1657, is one of the earliest French operas. After his death his son Marin de la Guerre succeeded him as organist and married Élisabeth Jacquet in 1684.

References

1605 births
1679 deaths
Musicians from Paris
French classical organists
French male organists
French male classical composers
French Baroque composers
17th-century classical composers
17th-century male musicians
Male classical organists